Triodia amasinus is a species of moth belonging to the family Hepialidae. It was described by Gottlieb August Wilhelm Herrich-Schäffer in 1851, and it is known from Turkey, Hungary, Romania, Bulgaria, the Republic of Macedonia, Albania and Greece.

The wingspan is about 23 mm.

References

External links
Hepialidae genera

Hepialidae
Moths described in 1851
Moths of Asia
Moths of Europe
Taxa named by Gottlieb August Wilhelm Herrich-Schäffer